Josefina Leontina Amanda Wettergrund, née Lundberg pseudonym Lea (2 September 1830, in Ronneby – 8 March 1903, in Stockholm), was a Swedish writer and poet. She was the editor of the family magazine Svalan in 1871–75.

Life
She was born to the custom official Carl Gustaf Kjellberg and Ulrika Lundberg. She was active as a governess and managed a girl school in Ronneby in 1850–1857 before she married the telegrapher Wilhelm Wettergrund and moved to Kalmar. From 1866, she lived in Stockholm.

She debuted as a published poet in 1858, and continued to contribute to various magazines and papers. In 1871–75, she edited the weekly family magazine Svalan, where August Strindberg debuted as a novelist. She was a well known and popular writer in contemporary Sweden, and admired particularly for her ability to depict the defects of human character with humor.

Works
 Småbitar på vers och prosa. Stockholm: Brudin. 1858–1869.
 Tant Fridas minnesblad: novell. Stockholm: Flodin. 1866. Libris 1585942
 Blommor för dagen: tre berättelser. Stockholm: Flodin. 1868. Libris 1585941
 En trip till Bleking. 1872. Libris 10051341
 Logogryfer, äldre och nyare. Stockholm: Bonnier. 1879. Libris 1601571
 Ett fågelpar: berättelse. Öreskrifter för folket, 99-1474700-0 ; 115. Stockholm: Bonnier. 1882. Libris 1601991 – Med tre illustrationer av Victor Andrén.
 Sven Vandring: berättelse. Öreskrifter för folket, 99-1474700-0 ; 121. Stockholm: Bonnier. 1882. Libris 8835304 – Med trenne teckningar av C.G. Hellqvist
 ”Ett par Ronnebybilder: 1 från "Lycksalighetens ö" : 2 Karön”. Svea : folk-kalender "1884,": sid. [153]-164. 1883. Libris 10649515
 Småherrskap: verklighetsbilder i fotografi från barnens krets. Stockholm: Bonnier. 1884. Libris 1601572
 Små bref till under- och öfverklassfolk från bror och syster. Linköping: Sahlström. 1890. Libris 1621683 – Medförfattare: Isidor Kjellberg.

Sources 
 Schöldström, Birger (1903). ”Josephine Wettergrund (Lea) [nekrolog]". Svea Folk-kalender (1904): sid. 229–236. Libris 2105141
 Josefina Wettergrund, författarpresentation i Projekt Runeberg
 Bäckström, Maud, "Vår första kvinnliga redaktör Josefina Wettergrund". Ingår i: Vitterhetsnöjen: läsning för humanister och andra : till Magnus von * * Platen den 1 maj 1980. Umeå: Univ. 1980. Libris 7615327. 
 Heggestad, Eva (1991). Fången och fri: 1880-talets svenska kvinnliga författare om hemmet, yrkeslivet och konstnärskapet = [Captive and free] : [Swedish women writers of the 1880s on the home, working life, and artistry]. Skrifter utgivna av Avdelningen för litteratursociologi vid Litteraturvetenskapliga institutionen i Uppsala, 0349-1145 ; 27. Uppsala: Avd. för litteratursociologi vid Litteraturvetenskapliga institutionen, Univ. Libris 7746142. 
 Ryberg, Inga (1996). ”Josephine Wettergrund – "Lea" – människa och skriftställarinna.”. Carlshamniana (Karlshamn : Föreningen Karlshamns museum, 1986–) "1996 (11),": sid. 39–100 : ill. ISSN 0283-7862. ISSN 0283-7862 ISSN 0283-7862. Libris 2271667
 Schaffer, Ingrid (1999). "Jag är endast en sparf, som sitter i takrännan och qvittrar": Josefina Wettergrund skriver för den läsande familjen. Stockholm: * Litteraturvetenskapliga institutionen, univ. Libris 2879697

Further reading 
 

1830 births
1903 deaths
Swedish women poets
19th-century Swedish women writers
19th-century Swedish poets
Swedish editors
19th-century Swedish journalists